Gábor Nagy (born 30 September 1981) is a Hungarian football player. He currently plays for Gyirmót SE in Hungary.

He signed for FC Aarau on 6 February 2007.

External links
Profile at HLSZ

References

1981 births
Living people
Sportspeople from Szombathely
Hungarian footballers
Hungary under-21 international footballers
Association football defenders
Szombathelyi Haladás footballers
Büki TK Bükfürdő footballers
Újpest FC players
Rákospalotai EAC footballers
FC Aarau players
APEP FC players
Gyirmót FC Győr players
Vasas SC players
Nemzeti Bajnokság I players
Swiss Super League players
Cypriot First Division players
Hungarian expatriate footballers
Expatriate footballers in Switzerland
Expatriate footballers in Cyprus
Hungarian expatriate sportspeople in Switzerland
Hungarian expatriate sportspeople in Cyprus